My Name Is Sultan is a Bangladeshi political action film directed by F I Manik. the film stars Shakib Khan and Sahara in the lead roles, with Ahmed Sharif, Misha Sawdagor, Prabir Mitra and Rehana Jolly playing other significant roles in the film. My Name Is Sultan was released on 20 August 2012. Some of the scenes also draws parallels from Sivaji.

Cast
 Shakib Khan as Abir/Sultan
 Sahara as Kajol
 Misha Sawdagor
 Ahmed Sharif
 Prabir Mitra
 Rehana Jolly
 Chikon Ali
 Ratan Khan
 Shamim Ahamed

References

2012 films
Bengali-language Bangladeshi films
2012 action films
Films scored by Ali Akram Shuvo
2010s Bengali-language films